Kanawha was a 471-ton steam-powered luxury yacht initially built in 1899 for millionaire industrialist and financier Henry Huttleston Rogers (1840–1909). One of the key men in the Standard Oil Trust, Rogers was one of the last of the robber barons of the Gilded Age in the United States.

Rogers was a major developer of coal and railroad properties in West Virginia along the Kanawha River. Aboard the Kanawha, he frequently hosted his friends, including American humorist Mark Twain and black educator Booker T. Washington.

After Rogers' death in 1909, the Kanawha served the U.S. Navy during World War I. After the war, it was sold to Marcus Garvey's ill-fated Black Star Line and renamed the S.S. Antonio Maceo. However, the former luxury yacht was apparently in poor condition by this time.  A boiler, used to generate steam to drive the ship, exploded, and a crewman was killed, while the vessel was located off the Virginia coast on its first voyage from New York to Cuba.

Construction
Consolidated Shipbuilding was a builder of luxury yachts. The Kanawha was built in 1899 at the shipyard on Matthewson Road, in the Morris Heights section of the Bronx, New York City. The shipyard moved after World War II. The former shipyard property later became part of Roberto Clemente State Park.

Crewed by a complement of 39 people, Kanawha was often compared by the newspapers of the day to the North Star, the yacht of a member of the Vanderbilt family. Even among its contemporaries in the fleet of the New York Yacht Club, Kanawha was a large vessel. The yacht cost $350,000 to build, and it had a record-setting speed of 22.2 knots.

Source of original name
The name Kanawha was probably selected by the original owner, Henry Huttleston Rogers. Among his many other activities, Rogers was an active investor and developer of West Virginia's coal lands and railroads in the area of the Kanawha River in the late 19th and early 20th century.

The latter included the Kanawha and Pocahontas Railroad Company incorporated in 1898. Its line ran  from the Kanawha River up a tributary called Paint Creek. Rogers negotiated its lease to the Chesapeake and Ohio Railway (C&O) in 1901 and its sale to a newly formed C&O subsidiary, Kanawha and Paint Creek Railway Company, in 1902.

That same year, Rogers began investing with William Nelson Page in the Deepwater Railway, which was built south into new coal lands from Deepwater in Fayette County on the Kanawha River.

US Navy service in World War I

Kanawha was acquired in April 1917 by the U.S. Navy from her then owner, John Borden, and commissioned as USS Kanawha II (SP–130) under Borden's command. She was placed into service as an escort for Allied convoys traveling across the dangerous North Atlantic Ocean. Later renamed Piqua, she attacked a German U-boat off the coast of France and drove it off. Following the end of hostilities she was returned to her pre-war owner in July 1919.

Black Star Line

The final chapter in the life of the Kanawha was as unusual as the way it had started. The Black Star Line was a shipping line incorporated by Marcus Garvey, who organized the United Negro Improvement Association (UNIA). The Black Star Line derived its name from the White Star Line, another shipping line whose success Garvey felt he could duplicate, which would become a standard of his Back-to-Africa movement.

Unfortunately for Garvey and his efforts, the ships he purchased beginning in 1919 were apparently both overpriced and in poor condition. Among these was the once-grand and well-maintained Kanawha. It was noted that Dr. Washington, the late educator, had been an honored guest aboard the ship years earlier. Renamed by the Black Star Line the S.S. Antonio Maceo, after putting in for unplanned repairs at Norfolk, it blew a boiler and killed a man off the Virginia coast on its first voyage from New York to Cuba, and had to be towed back to New York. The Black Star Line stopped sailing in February 1922, and was soon out of business.

References

Steam yachts
Ships built in Morris Heights, Bronx
Ships of the Black Star Line